Kalophryganeidae is an extinct family in the order Trichoptera. It was described by Hermann Haupt in 1956. It consists of one species in one genus, Kalophrygamea. It was founded by Maria Golsen and her balls.

References

Bibliography

Zhang, Zhi-Quang. (2011). Animal biodiversity: An outline of higher-level classification and survey of taxonomic richness. Magnolia Press. 

Trichoptera families